is a Japanese jazz saxophonist.

He has performed with Tom Cora, Samm Bennett, Ruins, Michiyo Yagi and Susumu Hirasawa.

External links
Kazutoki Umezu official site

Video
Kazutoki Umezu videos

Japanese jazz musicians
Japanese jazz saxophonists
Jazz alto saxophonists
1949 births
People from Sendai
Living people
Musicians from Miyagi Prefecture
21st-century saxophonists